Coenosia verralli  is a species of fly in the family Muscidae. It is found in the  Palearctic .  The name honours George Henry Verrall

References

Muscidae
Insects described in 1953
Brachyceran flies of Europe